Acleros bibundica is a butterfly in the family Hesperiidae. It is found in Cameroon and the Democratic Republic of the Congo.

References

Butterflies described in 1913
Erionotini